The Medal of the Most Excellent Order of the British Empire for Gallantry, known as the Empire Gallantry Medal (EGM), was a British medal awarded for acts of gallantry. Unlike the then existing Sea Gallantry Medal (SGM) (1854), the Albert Medal (AM) (1866) and the Edward Medal (EM) (1907) which each had two classes with restricted eligibility criteria, the EGM was a single class award with wide eligibility. It was instituted by King George V on 29 December 1922. In July 1937, recipients were granted the right to use the post-nominal letters "EGM".

The EGM was a medal of the Order of the British Empire and like the Order itself, was divided into civil and military divisions, but unlike the British Empire Medal (BEM), officers were eligible for the medal.

History
In 1922, the original Medal of the Order of the British Empire was discontinued and replaced by two separate awards, the Medal of the Order of the British Empire for Gallantry (EGM), and the Medal of the Order of the British Empire for Meritorious Service, known as the British Empire Medal. The EGM had been ranked after the SGM, AM and EM on the Order of Wear but was superseded by the George Cross in 1940.

On 24 September 1940 King George VI created the George Cross, to rank immediately after the Victoria Cross, to recognize gallantry not in the presence of the enemy. The EGM ceased the same day. In April 1941, it was announced that, except for honorary recipients, all living recipients and the next-of-kin of those posthumously awarded the EGM after 3 September 1939, were to exchange their insignia for the George Cross. In 1971, all living recipients of the Albert Medal and Edward Medal were deemed George Cross holders but unlike EGM recipients the exchange of their original insignia for the George Cross was optional.

Appearance
It is a circular silver medal,  in diameter, with a straight suspender augmented with laurel leaves. The recipient's name was impressed on the rim. Except for the ribbon, the design of the civil and military divisions was the same.

The obverse showed Britannia facing right, her left and resting on a shield and right hand holding a trident, with a sun in the upper right corner. The wording "For God and the Empire" was inscribed round the upper side, and "For Gallantry" in the exergue.

The first reverse had the Royal Cypher surrounded by six lions. 
The 2nd type, adopted after the accession of George VI in 1937, had the Royal Cypher with four lions, two on either side with, below, the wording "Instituted by George V".

The original ribbon was plain purple, with the addition of a thin vertical red stripe for military awards. A silver laurel branch was added diagonally to the ribbon for both types of the award in 1933, and was worn on the ribbon bar when ribbons alone were worn. The ribbon changed to rose pink with pearl grey edges in July 1937, with an addition pearl grey vertical stripe for military awards, and stayed in this version until the medal's revocation.

Statistics
There were a total of 130 awards, including eight made posthumously:
 Civil Division	64 (3 posthumous)
 Military Division	62 (5 posthumous)
 Honorary awards 4 (non-British citizens, 3 French and 1 Belgian)

The four honorary awards were not able to be exchanged for the George Cross. On 24 September 1940, 107 of the other 126 recipients were living and all exchanged awards. The next of kin of five deceased recipients, Herbert John (Bertie) Mahoney whose EGM award was gazetted on 23 December 1927 and the four Military Division posthumous awards gazetted after the start of World War II also exchanged awards.

Selected recipients

Awards of the EGM that were not exchanged for the George Cross are marked below with (*).

References

External links
 Information on the Empire Gallantry Medal
 

Civil awards and decorations of the United Kingdom
 
Courage awards
Awards established in 1922
Awards disestablished in 1940